Tyler Jordan Hall (born March 25, 1997) is an American professional basketball player for the Texas Legends of the NBA G League. He played college basketball for the Montana State Bobcats.

High school career
Hall attended Rock Island High School. He was named the 2014–15 Dispatch/Argus Metro boys' basketball co-player of the Year. Hall was twice named to the All-State team but was lightly recruited out of high school.

College career
As a freshman, Hall averaged 18.6 points per game and was named Big Sky Freshman of the Year. Hall had a career-high 42 points in a game against Milwaukee on December 5, 2016. He posted 23.1 points, 5.4 rebounds and 2.8 assists per game as a sophomore. Hall was named to the First-team All-Big Sky Conference. As a junior, Hall averaged 17.5 points and 7.7 rebounds per game. He declared for the 2018 NBA draft but decided to return to school.

Hall eclipsed the 2,000-point mark in an 81–76 win over North Dakota. As a senior, Hall averaged 20.5 points, 2.8 assists and 4.7 rebounds per game. He was named to the First-team All-Big Sky Conference. He ranks ninth all-time in 3-pointers made in Division I basketball with 431. Hall finished his career with 2,518 points, breaking the Big Sky Conference record of held by Eastern Washington's Bogdan Bliznyuk.

Professional career

Westchester Knicks (2019–2021)
Hall participated in the 2019 NBA Summer League with the Chicago Bulls. He was selected fourth overall in the 2019 NBA G League draft by the Westchester Knicks. In January 2020, he averaged 12.3 points and 4.0 rebounds per game. On the season, he averaged 9.3 points and 3.4 rebounds per game, and his 91 three-pointers were second most for a Westchester rookie.

On December 12, 2020, Hall was signed by the New York Knicks, and then waived on December 14. He rejoined the Westchester Knicks and averaged 10.1 points, 4.1 rebounds and 2.6 assists per game in the 2020–21 season.

In August 2021, Hall joined the New York Knicks for the 2021 NBA Summer League and on October 8, he signed with them. However, he was waived by the Knicks near the end of training camp. In October 2021, Hall was included on the training camp roster of the Westchester Knicks. In 11 games, he averaged 14.6 points, 4.2 rebounds and 3.2 assists over 38.5 minutes.

New York Knicks (2021)
On December 18, 2021, Hall signed a 10-day contract with the New York Knicks.

Return to Westchester Knicks (2022)
On January 2, 2022, Hall was reacquired and activated by the Westchester Knicks. In the first game of the regular season, Hall posted 31 points, 6 assists and 5 rebounds in a 127–108 loss to the Grand Rapids Gold. In September 2022, he was signed by the Dallas Mavericks, but waived on October 13.

Texas Legends (2022–present)
On November 3, 2022, Hall was named to the opening night roster for the Texas Legends.

Career statistics

NBA

|-
| style="text-align:left;"| 
| style="text-align:left;"| New York
| 1 || 0 || 2.0 || — || — || — || .0 || .0 || .0 || .0 || .0
|- class="sortbottom"
| style="text-align:center;" colspan="2"| Career
| 1 || 0 || 2.0 || — || — || — || .0 || .0 || .0 || .0 || .0

See also
 List of NCAA Division I men's basketball career scoring leaders
 List of NCAA Division I men's basketball career 3-point scoring leaders

References

External links
Montana State Bobcats bio

1997 births
Living people
21st-century African-American sportspeople
African-American basketball players
American men's basketball players
Basketball players from Illinois
Montana State Bobcats men's basketball players
New York Knicks players
Shooting guards
Sportspeople from Rock Island, Illinois
Undrafted National Basketball Association players
United States men's national basketball team players
Westchester Knicks players